The 2005 World Junior Figure Skating Championships were held at The Aud - Dom Cardillo Arena in Kitchener, Canada from February 28 to March 6. The event is open to figure skaters from ISU member nations who have reached the age of 13 by July 1 of the previous year, but have not yet turned 19. The upper age limit for men competing in pairs and dance is 21. Skaters compete in four disciplines: men's singles, ladies' singles, pair skating, and ice dancing.

The term "Junior" refers to the age level rather than the skill level. Therefore, some of the skaters competing had competed nationally and internationally at the senior level, but were still age-eligible for World Juniors.

The compulsory dance was the Blues. Due to the large number of participants, the men's and ladies' qualifying groups were split into groups A and B. Scores did not carry over from qualifying and so were not factored into the total score or placements.

Medals table

Results

Men

Ladies

Pairs

Ice dancing

External links

 2005 World Junior Figure Skating Championships

World Junior Figure Skating Championships
World Junior Figure Skating Championships, 2005
F
World Junior 2005
2005 in Ontario